Mandurah Storm Rugby League Club is an Australian rugby league club based in the city of Mandurah, Western Australia. The club was founded in 2013. They currently compete in the NRLWA administered competition. They manage junior and senior teams.

Emblem and Colours                          
The Mandurah Storm's primary colours are purple and yellow, but also a small portion of white is on their jersey. Their logo has been the same ever since being designed in 2013.

Sponsors 
 NRL for WA
 Sports Power

Notable players:
Morgan Jones

References

External links
Mandurah Storm

Rugby league teams in Western Australia
2013 establishments in Australia
Rugby clubs established in 2013
Sport in Mandurah